The 2012–13 Michigan State Spartans represented Michigan State University in the 2012–13 NCAA Division I men's basketball season. The head coach was Tom Izzo who was in his 18th year. The team played their home games at Breslin Center in East Lansing, MI and were members of the Big Ten Conference. MSU finished with a record of 27–9, 13–5 to finish in a tie for second place in Big Ten play. The Spartans lost in the semifinals of the Big Ten tournament to Ohio State. MSU received a bid to the NCAA tournament for the 16th straight year where they reached the Sweet Sixteen for the second consecutive year, losing to Duke.

Previous season 
The Spartans finished the 2011–12 season with a record of 29–8, 13–5 to earn a share of the Big Ten Championship. They won the Big Ten tournament to earn a No. 1 seed in the NCAA tournament, their 15th straight trip to the Tournament, and advanced to the Sweet Sixteen before losing to Louisville.

Offeseason 
The Spartans lost Draymond Green (16.2 PPG, 10.6 RPG, 3.8 APG) to the NBA draft following the season.

2012 recruiting class
Michigan State's top-10 ranked recruiting class, was headlined by 6'4" SG Gary Harris. The rest of the class consisted of PF Matt Costello, PF Kenny Kaminski, and PG Denzel Valentine. Notably, Matt Costello and Denzel Valentine finished first and second, respectively, in the voting for Michigan's Mr. Basketball, MSU's fourth straight Mr. Basketball signee (2011 winner Dwaun Anderson originally signed with Michigan State, but was released from his National Letter of Intent to go to Wagner College for personal reasons).

Season summary
Juniors Adreian Payne (10.5 points and 7.6 rebounds per game) and Keith Appling (13.4 points per game), senior Derrick Nix (9.9 points and 6.6 rebounds per game), and sophomore Branden Dawson (8.9 points and 5.9 rebounds per game) led the Spartans. Freshman Gary Harris (12.9 points per game) also played a major role for the Spartans. The Spartans began the season ranked No. 14 in both polls and traveled to Germany to play Connecticut at Ramstein Air Force Base. The Spartans were stunned by UConn, but rebounded with a win over No. 7 Kansas in the Champions Classic. Shortly thereafter, MSU fell to Miami in the ACC-Big Ten Challenge. The Spartans defeated Tuskegee at Jenison Field House, their former basketball home on Michigan State's campus in a series of games held to commemorate the "Game of Change" that occurred during the 1963 NCAA tournament. The Spartans cruised through the remaining non-conference season to finish at 11–2 and ranked No. 18 in the country.

Michigan State lost their first Big Ten game to No. 9-ranked Minnesota, but won their next six conference games. The streak included a win over No. 11 Ohio State. Following a loss to No. 7 Indiana, MSU again went on a winning streak, winning their next five games including wins against No. 18 Minnesota and No. 4 Michigan. The streak ended with losses to No. 1 Indiana, at No. 18 Ohio State, and at No. 4 Michigan in a three-game stretch leaving MSU at 11–5 in conference. MSU rebounded to win the final two games against No. 22 Wisconsin and Northwestern. The Spartans finished in a second place tie with Ohio State with a 13–5 conference record and ranked No. 8 in the country.

As the No. 3 seed in the Big Ten tournament, MSU faced Iowa in the quarterfinals. After a brutal first half where the Spartans only mustered 20 points and trailed Iowa 30–20 at the break, MSU responded. Led by Keith Appling and Gary Harris' 13 points each, MSU rallied from a 12-point deficit in the second half to pull out the 59–56 victory. The win moved MSU to the semifinals of the tournament against Ohio State. In a hard fought battle, MSU was unable to pull out the victory, falling to OSU 61–58.

The Spartans received a No. 3 seed in the NCAA tournament, their 16th straight appearance in the Tournament. Led by Derrick Nix's 23 points and 15 rebounds in the game, as the Spartans cruised to a 65–54 win over Valparaiso in the First Round. In the Second Round, Gary Harris led the Spartans with 23 points as MSU blew out Memphis to advance to their fifth Sweet Sixteen in six years. The trip to the Sweet Sixteen also marked the Spartans 11th trip in the prior 16 years. However, the Spartans were defeated by No. 2 seed Duke, who was led by Seth Curry with 29 points, in the Sweet Sixteen. Appling's 16 points and Payne's 14 were not enough in the loss.

Roster

Depth chart

Schedule and results

|-
!colspan=9 style=| Exhibition

			
|-
!colspan=9 style=| Non-conference regular season

|-
!colspan=9 style=|Big Ten regular season

|-
!colspan=9 style=|Big Ten tournament

|- 
!colspan=9 style=|NCAA tournament

Player statistics 

Source

Rankings

*AP does not release post-NCAA tournament rankings

Source

Awards and honors 
 Gary Harris - Big Ten Freshman of the Year
 Gary Harris - All Big Ten Second Team
 Adreian Payne - All Big Ten Second Team
 Keith Appling - All Big Ten Second Team (Coaches); All Big Ten Third Team (Media)
 Derrick Nix - All Big Ten Honorable Mention (Coaches)
 Keith Appling - NABC All-District Second Team

References

Michigan State Spartans men's basketball seasons
Michigan State
Michigan State
2012 in sports in Michigan
2013 in sports in Michigan